Delph is a village in Greater Manchester, England.

Delph may also refer to:

 Delph, the Hiberno-English term for delftware
 Delph, Alberta, a locality in Canada
 Delph Donkey, railway line which formerly served Delph
 Delph Locks (or, Delph Nine), a series of locks on the Dudley No. 1 Canal in Brierley Hill, in the West Midlands, England
 Delph railway station, which formerly served Delph
 Ivey Delph Apartments, historic apartment building located in Hamilton Heights, New York
Fabian Delph (born 1989), English footballer
John M. Delph (1805–1891), a mayor of Louisville, Kentucky
Marvin Delph (born 1956), American basketball player
Mike Delph (born 1970), American politician (Indiana)
Paul Delph (1957–1996), American musician

See also
Delf (disambiguation)
Delft (disambiguation)

English-language surnames